Foxboro station is an MBTA Commuter Rail station in Foxborough, Massachusetts, located adjacent to Gillette Stadium and the Patriot Place shopping center. The station has a single side platform serving the main track of the Framingham Secondary. Previous passenger service on the line ran from 1870 to 1933, with several three stations in Foxborough. Special service for New England Patriots games and other stadium events ran from 1971 to 1973, then resumed in 1986. Event trains run from Boston via the Franklin Line and from Providence via the Providence/Stoughton Line (Northeast Corridor). 

Regular weekday service to the station via the Franklin Line was studied in 2010 and proposed in 2014. A pilot program of service was announced in 2017, and ten daily round trips began operation in October 2019. The pilot was suspended in November 2020, but four midday round trips resumed on May 23, 2022. A new one-year pilot began on September 12, 2022.

Station design

Foxboro station is located in the northern part of Foxboro, adjacent to the Gillette Stadium sports complex and Patriot Place shopping center. It is on the far east side of the site, and is separated from the rest of the complex by the Neponset River. A pedestrian walkway from the station runs under an access road and to the north end of the stadium. The station has a single side platform serving the main track of the Framingham Secondary, with a mini-high section at the south end for accessibility; a passing siding allows freight trains to pass stopped passenger trains at the station.

History

Previous stations

The Mansfield and Framingham Railroad opened between its namesake towns in 1870 and was immediately leased to the Boston, Clinton and Fitchburg Railroad (later the Boston, Clinton, Fitchburg and New Bedford Railroad). In 1879, it became part of the Old Colony Railroad, which was in turn acquired by the New York, New Haven and Hartford Railroad in 1893. There were three stations on the line in Foxborough – Foxvale at Spring Street, Foxboro at Bird Street, and North Foxboro at North Street – plus South Walpole at Summer Street just over the Walpole border.

The original Foxboro station, a three-story structure with a Mansard roof, was a converted coffin shop. A two-story brick station with a Spanish-style roof was constructed in 1911. South Walpole station burned on February 23, 1911, due to a defective chimney, and was soon rebuilt. The lightly-used North Foxboro and Foxvale stations were closed in 1928.

The line remained in use for freight service, passing to Penn Central in 1969 and Conrail in 1976. Special trains were operated to the opening of the Bay State Raceway in 1948. None of the three Foxborough station buildings survive, though the former South Walpole station remains in use as a post office.

MBTA event service
The service started with the opening of Schaefer Stadium (later Sullivan Stadium, then Foxboro Stadium) on August 15, 1971, with trains from Boston and Providence. Providence service ended early in the 1973 season due to low ridership; Boston service ended that October. Plans were made to resume Boston service for the 1982 season, but this was interrupted by a railroad strike and an NFL strike. Boston–Foxboro service via the Franklin Line ultimately resumed with the 1986 season. Beginning with the 1989 season, it was moved to the Providence/Stoughton Line, with a reverse move at Mansfield and intermediate stops at Back Bay,  (dropped by 1993), and Mansfield. 

An accessible platform was added by 1996. Providence service resumed for the 1997 season, with intermediate stops at South Attleboro, Attleboro, and Mansfield. Foxboro Stadium was replaced with the adjacent Gillette Stadium in 2002. By 2005, ridership per event averaged 1,567. The Norwood Central stop was dropped in 2011.

Weekday service

In September 2010, the MBTA completed a study to determine the feasibility of extending full-time commuter rail service to Foxboro via the Franklin Line. The options with through service to Boston were to include the addition of a second track at Foxboro station, converting it to an island platform.

In January 2014, the state began discussions with stadium owner Kraft Group for use of the stadium parking lots. The MassDOT Board authorized the purchase of the Framingham Subdivision from CSX that June. By November 2014, the MBTA planned to run five daily Boston–Foxboro round trips, but town officials objected to the plans being made without local input. The $23 million purchase of the line was completed in June 2015, making it the Framingham Secondary. 

In February 2017, Kraft Group owner Robert Kraft agreed to subsidize the costs of a pilot service up to $200,000 per year, with 500 parking spaces made available. The pilot was supported by Foxborough officials, but opposed by Walpole officials. In August 2017, the MBTA Board approved an 11-month pilot program of service to Foxboro, planned to begin in late 2018 or early 2019. Daily ridership was expected to be 210 passengers, with the majority diverted from other commuter rail stations. Most of the pilot service would be extended Fairmount Line trains, which prompted concerns that the pilot would increase crowding and decrease reliability on the Fairmount Line. 

In November 2017, the MBTA indicated that service would begin on May 20, 2019. About  of track between Walpole and south of Foxboro station was upgraded in preparation for the service. A freight passing track was added at the station, and the section from Walpole to Foxboro was signalized.

After an additional delay, pilot service began on October 21, 2019. Initial service was ten daily round trips, including both peak and midday trips. Seven of the ten round trips were extended Fairmount Line trains. By December 2019, the pilot averaged 70 daily boardings at Foxboro – just one-third of the projected ridership. On November 2, 2020, the pilot was suspended due to reduced ridership as a result of the COVID-19 pandemic; it was then expected to resume in spring 2021. Four midday Foxboro round trips – but no peak Foxboro service – ultimately resumed on May 23, 2022. A new one-year Foxboro pilot began on September 12, 2022, with  Boston–Foxboro round trips on weekdays.

References

External links

MBTA – Foxboro
MBTA – Gillette Stadium

1971 establishments in Massachusetts
Buildings and structures in Foxborough, Massachusetts
Stations along Old Colony Railroad lines
MBTA Commuter Rail stations in Norfolk County, Massachusetts
Railway stations in the United States opened in 1971